Luca Dalmonte (born 3 October 1963) is an Italian professional basketball coach, currently serving as the head coach of Fortitudo Bologna in Lega Serie A2.

From 2013-2015 he was head coach of Virtus Roma in Italy's Lega Basket Serie A and has also been the assistant coach of Italy's national basketball team.

In 2012-13, he was coach for Fenerbahçe in Turkey.

On 23 March 2022 he signed with Skyliners Frankfurt of the Basketball Bundesliga.

References

External links
EuroLeague Profile
Eurobasket.com Profile

Videos
Luca Dalmonte Youtube.com video 

1963 births
Living people
Sportspeople from Bologna
Fenerbahçe basketball coaches
Fortitudo Pallacanestro Bologna coaches
Italian basketball coaches
Mens Sana Basket coaches
Pallacanestro Cantù coaches
Pallacanestro Reggiana coaches
Pallacanestro Virtus Roma coaches
Scaligera Basket Verona coaches
Victoria Libertas Pesaro coaches